Who's The Boss is a 2020 Nigerian romantic comedy film produced, written, and directed by Chinaza Onuzo (Naz Onuzo) on his directorial debut. The film stars Sharon Ooja, Funke Akindele and Blossom Chukwujekwu in the lead roles. The film was premiered on 16 February 2020 in Lagos. The film washed its theatrical release on 28 February 2020 and opened to positive reviews becoming a box office success.

Cast 

 Sharon Ooja as Liah
 Funke Akindele as Hauwa
 Blossom Chukwujekwu as Lekan
 Ini Dima-Okojie as Jumoke
 Beverly Osu
 Bolly Lomo
 Tayo Faniran

Synopsis 
Liah played by (Sharon Ooja) a young advertisement agency executive is forced to invent a boss to keep her employer from finding out when her side-hustle startup and agency wins a major deal. Things start to go from bad to worse case scenario as she gets increasingly more successful and she has to keep her own boss away from finding out.

Production 
Co-founder of Inkblot Productions, Chinaza Onuzo who is well known for his credits as a writer for notable films such as The Wedding Party 2, New Money and  The Set Up made his directorial debut through this film and he announced it in his Instagram account. This film was the 12th film to be produced under the production banner Inkblot Productions. The official teaser of the film was unveiled on 10 January 2020.

References

External links 

2020 films
2020 romantic comedy films
Nigerian romantic comedy films
English-language Nigerian films
Films shot in Nigeria
2020 directorial debut films
2020s English-language films